Clisospiridae is an extinct taxonomic family of sea snails, marine gastropod molluscs.

This family consists of three following subfamilies (according to the taxonomy of the Gastropoda by Bouchet & Rocroi, 2005):
 Cliospirinae S. A. Miller, 1889 - synonym: Progalerinae Knight, 1956
 Atracurinae Horný, 1964
 Trochoclisinae Horný, 1964

References